Siveh Kadeh-ye Olya (also Romanized as Siveh Kadeh-ye ‘Olyā; also known as Sīb Godā-ye Bālā) is a village in Lahijan-e Sharqi Rural District, Lajan District, Piranshahr County, West Azerbaijan Province, Iran. At the 2006 census, its population was 63, in 9 families.

References 

Populated places in Piranshahr County